P. princeps may refer to:
 Phidippus princeps, a jumping spider species in the genus Phidippus found in the United States and Canada
 Plantago princeps, the ale, a flowering plant species endemic to Hawaii
 Pleuroploca princeps, a sea snail species
 Ploceus princeps, the Príncipe weaver, a bird species endemic to São Tomé and Príncipe
 Pseudolimnophila princeps, a crane fly species in the genus Pseudolimnophila
 Psilophyton princeps, an extinct vascular plant species

Synonyms 
 Passerculus princeps, a synonym for Passerculus sandwichensis, the Savannah sparrow, a bird species found in America
 Pirimela princeps, a synonym for Pirimela denticulata, a crab species found from the British Isles to Mauritania, the Mediterranean Sea, the Canary Islands, the Cape Verde Islands and the Azores